The 1905–06 Football League season was Birmingham Football Club's 14th in the Football League, their 6th in the First Division, and their first season under the name "Birmingham", having previously played as "Small Heath". They finished in seventh place in the 20-team league. They also took part in the 1905–06 FA Cup, entering at the first round proper and losing to Newcastle United in the fourth round (quarter-final) after a replay.

Twenty-three players made at least one appearance in nationally organised first-team competition, and there were twelve different goalscorers. Goalkeeper Nat Robinson was ever-present over the 44-match season; among outfield players, forwards Benny Green (footballer) and Billy Jones missed two and three matches respectively. Billy Jones was leading scorer with 24 goals, of which 22 came in the league.

The Coventry Road ground, by then surrounded by tightly-packed housing, had more than once proved too small to accommodate those wishing to attend. Against Aston Villa last season, "hundreds of people found the doors closed against them, and probably there were thousands who would not go to the ground in view of the inevitable crush", and attendance at the FA Cup fourth-round tie against Newcastle was restricted to 27,000 with "probably 60,000 people anxious to attend". The landlords had raised the rent, but refused either to sell the freehold or to allow further expansion to the ground, and the directors estimated that remaining at Coventry Road was losing the club as much as £2,000 a year in revenue. Club director Harry Morris identified a site three-quarters of a mile (1 km) nearer the city centre, on the site of a disused brickworks in the Bordesley district, where a new ground could be built. The directors signed a 21-year lease and construction began.

Football League First Division

League table (part)

FA Cup

Appearances and goals

Players with name struck through and marked  left the club during the playing season.

See also
Birmingham City F.C. seasons

References
General
 Matthews, Tony (1995). Birmingham City: A Complete Record. Breedon Books (Derby). .
 Matthews, Tony (2010). Birmingham City: The Complete Record. DB Publishing (Derby). .
 Source for match dates and results: "Birmingham City 1905–1906: Results". Statto Organisation. Retrieved 22 May 2012.
 Source for lineups, appearances, goalscorers and attendances: Matthews (2010), Complete Record, pp. 256–57. Note that attendance figures are estimated.
 Source for kit: "Birmingham City". Historical Football Kits. Retrieved 22 May 2018.

Specific

Birmingham City F.C. seasons
Birmingham